is a railway station on the Iida Line in the city of Iida,  Nagano Prefecture, Japan, operated by Central Japan Railway Company (JR Central).

Lines
Tenryūkyō Station is served by the Iida Line and is 116.2 kilometers from the starting point of the line at Toyohashi Station.

Station layout
The station consists of a ground-level side platform and a ground-level island platform connected by a level crossing. The station is staffed.

Platforms

Adjacent stations

History
Tenryūkyō Station opened on 16 December 1927.  With the privatization of Japanese National Railways (JNR) on 1 April 1987, the station came under the control of JR Central.

Passenger statistics
In fiscal 2015, the station was used by an average of 319 passengers daily (boarding passengers only).

Surrounding area
Tenryū River
Tenryū-kyō

See also
 List of railway stations in Japan

References

External links

 Tenryūkyō Station information 

Railway stations in Nagano Prefecture
Railway stations in Japan opened in 1927
Stations of Central Japan Railway Company
Iida Line
Iida, Nagano